Q and Not U was a post-hardcore band from Washington, D.C., signed to Dischord Records. Members John Davis, Harris Klahr, Christopher Richards, and Matt Borlik formed the band in 1998. After Borlik's departure following the release of their first album, the band went on to record two more critically acclaimed LPs as a three-piece, exploring aspects of dance-punk and other disparate musical styles. Q and Not U disbanded in September 2005 after completing their touring commitments and a short farewell stand at Washington, D.C. venue the Black Cat.

Music
John Davis, Harris Klahr, Christopher Richards, and Matt Borlik formed Q and Not U in the summer of 1998 and began playing shows in the D.C. area later that November. They released their first album, No Kill No Beep Beep, in late 2000. It was marked by strongly rhythmic compositions with dissonant guitar and bass, though each song was built around unique melodies and danceable beats that cut through and rode on top of the swells of noise. Several reviewers described the music as "catchy", and this quality of oblique yet upbeat and endearing musicality would be a trademark of the band's future work, setting them apart from their aurally less forgiving D.C. hardcore peers and bringing them more into line with the budding dance-punk scene.

Following extensive touring in 2000 and 2001, alongside bands like Engine Down, Milemarker, Ted Leo and The Pharmacists, and El Guapo, bassist Borlik was dismissed in November 2001. His absence prompted a more slimmed-down sound as reflected in 2002's Different Damage. Guitarist Richards occasionally took a turn on bass guitar or keyboard and Klahr also incorporated keyboards, as well as a baritone guitar, though they left bass instruments out of some songs altogether, and the album is instead driven by ever-more complex and propulsive dance beats, razor sharp guitar licks ("So Many Animal Calls", "When the Lines Go Down"), and pronounced use of multiple overlapping vocals from each member of the band ("Snow Patterns", "No Damage Nocturne"). The album also expanded upon the small patches of hushed tapping cultivated on No Kill... ("We Heart Our Hive") into fully grown bodies of delicate rhythm ("Soft Pyramids"). The band toured extensively following the release, making their way through the U.S., Europe, South Africa, Canada, and Japan.

While Different Damage pulled a lot of sound out of very little equipment, the band put together Power (2004) using a greater variety of instruments, most notably synths, melodicas and recorders and integrated these new sounds into more delicate, multi-faceted, and ever-more variegated songs. The use of guttural and aggressive bass synth rafts on "Wonderful People" and other songs is especially prominent and adds greater depth to the songs, as well as giving heightened value to the bass-less, jangly interludes throughout the album. The tensed and urgent vocal delivery that had been part of each previous release was also pushed to new limits, now developing into falsetto ("Throw Back Your Head") and startling choral arrangements ("District Night Prayer") that had been previously unexplored.

Miscellaneous details
 Q and Not U released very little non-album material; all of the band's songs have been included on one of their three LPs, except for three tracks: "Busy Lights, Busy Carpet," from their debut single, 'Hot and Informed', "Ten Thousand Animal Calls," from On Play Patterns, and a cover of Neil Young's "Don't Let It Bring You Down" from the compilation Don't Know When I'll Be Back Again. "You Did It Electric" is an unreleased song often played live in early shows.
On Play Patterns and the Book of Flags/X-Polynation single contain different recordings of tracks that also appeared on full-lengths.

"After seven years, hundreds of shows, thousands of miles, 46 states, four continents, three albums, only one flat-tire and countless nicknames for Shawn Brackbill, Q and Not U is disbanding," wrote band member Chris Richards.
"With all of your support, we feel that we've reached all of our shared goals as Q and Not U and we're ready to move on to other projects in life. We all hope to play music together again someday, but we feel that it's a beautiful and natural time to bring this band to a close."

Band members
 Harris Klahr – vocals, guitars, synthesizers, melodica (1998–2005)
 Christopher Richards – vocals, guitars, synthesizers (1998–2005); bass (2001–2005)
 John Davis – drums, percussion, backing vocals (1998–2005)
 Matthew Borlik – bass (1998–2001)

In 2009, Richards was named Pop Critic for The Washington Post.

Releases

Albums
 No Kill No Beep Beep (Dischord, October 2000)
 Different Damage (Dischord, October 2002)
 Power (Dischord, October 2004)

Singles
 Hot and Informed (Dischord/Desoto, April 2000)
 On Play Patterns (Dischord, April 2002)
 X-Polynation/Book of Flags (Dischord, September 2003)
 Wonderful People Remix EP (Dischord, September 2005)

External links
 Dischord Records Band Site
 Pitchfork Media, interview with the band (January 2005)
 , Richards joins Washington Post
 , Rich Jones articles on WashingtonPost.com
 D.C. punk collection at the University of Maryland
 John Davis collection on punk at the University of Maryland

Sources 

Dance-punk musical groups
Dischord Records artists
Musical groups from Washington, D.C.
Indie rock musical groups from Washington, D.C.
Musical groups established in 1998
American post-hardcore musical groups